St. Brice's Church in Gościęcin, Poland, is a historic, wooden shrine belonging to the Parish of the Assumption of the Holy Virgin Mary in Gościęcin.

The church was built in 1661 (renovated in 1880 and dedicated to St. Brice). Formerly, in its location stood a wooden chapel from 1594. The church was funded by Marta and Marcin Wolff, the latter the owner of the sołectwo in Gościęcin. The church was built on the peripheries of the village, on a nearby hill. There, in its peripheries stands a water well (St. Brice's Well), which is given healing properties. Additionally, there is a hermitage in the area (from before 1870), presently transformed into a mountain hut. The whole church area is known as Bryksy.

References

Kędzierzyn-Koźle County
Gościęcin